Army nursing may refer to:

By country

Australia
Royal Australian Army Nursing Corps
Australian Army Medical Women's Service
Australian Service Nurses National Memorial, Canberra

Britain
Queen Alexandra's Royal Army Nursing Corps
Women's Royal Army Corps

India
Military Nursing Service (India)

New Zealand
List of New Zealand organizations with royal patronage

Pakistan
Pakistan Army

Republic of Korea
Republic of Korea military academies

Sri Lanka
Sri Lanka Army Medical Corps

United States
United States Army Nurse Corps

Education
Cadet Nurse Corps
Uniformed Services University of the Health Sciences section USU Graduate School of Nursing

Specific conflicts
Timeline of nursing history

Pre-1900s
International Committee of the Red Cross
International Red Cross and Red Crescent Movement
American Red Cross Nursing Service

World War I
Women in the First World War

World War II
Women's roles in the World Wars

Military nursing services
Military nurse
U.S. Navy Nurse Corps, a staff corps of the United States Navy
U.S. Air Force Nurse Corps

Army nursing in films
Vietnam Nurses documentary about Australian nurse experience.
China Beach (season 1)
China Beach (season 2)
China Beach (season 3)
MASH (film)
M*A*S*H (TV series)